Adrian Township is a township in Edmunds County, South Dakota, United States.

References

Townships in Edmunds County, South Dakota
Townships in South Dakota